The Hampster Dance  is one of the earliest Internet memes. Created in 1998 by Canadian art student Deidre LaCarte as a GeoCities page, the dance features rows of animated GIFs of hamsters and other rodents dancing in various ways to a sped-up sample from the song "Whistle-Stop", written and performed by Roger Miller for the 1973 Walt Disney Productions film Robin Hood. In 2005, CNET named the Hampster Dance the number-one Web fad.

Background

Canadian art student Deidre LaCarte (of Nanaimo, British Columbia) was in a competition with her best friend and sister to generate the most Web traffic when she created the Hampster Dance page with the free Geocities web service in August 1998.  She named the site Hampton's Hamster House in homage to her pet hamster, "Hampton Hamster", who on the page declared his intent to become a "Web star."

The Hampster Dance site originally consisted of a single page with just four hamsters animated GIFs, repeated in rows by the dozens and with an infectious background tune that looped endlessly. At the time the page was created, embedding background music in HTML pages was a fairly novel browser feature. The clip, a nine-second looped WAV file, was a sped-up sample of Roger Miller's "Whistle Stop", a song written for the opening credits of the 1973 Disney animated feature film Robin Hood.

From its creation in August 1998 to March 1999, the Hampster Dance site only recorded about 800 total visits (roughly four per day). In February 1999, word of the website spread by e-mail and early blogs. By March, the site gathered approximately 60,000 views in four days. Soon the site was even featured on bumper stickers and in a television commercial for Internet service provider EarthLink. A common office prank at that time was to set a co-worker's browser homepage to the Hampster Dance Web site, which led to televised news reports that furthered its notoriety to an international level. Fans of the site created variations on the original theme, using politicians such as Dan Quayle and Cynthia McKinney, as well as household objects such as Pez dispensers.

The original website was hosted on Geocities, and LaCarte failed to register the hampsterdance.com domain. With the continued popularity of the original site, an unauthorized duplicate website was hosted on hampsterdance.com. LaCarte thus used the domains hamsterdance.com, hamsterdance2.com, and hampsterdance2.com. In early 2000, the domain was transferred to humor business Nutty Sites for undisclosed reasons. In late 2001, LaCarte sold the "Hampster Dance" rights to Abatis International, who managed to acquire the original domain. The site later expanded, revealing the names of all four characters (Hampton, Dixie, Hado, and Fuzzy) and offering themed versions for birthdays, graduation, holidays, etc. The original website is no longer functional, but other sites inspired by the original still exist.

Hampton and the Hampsters
The popularity of the website led to the creation of a full song called "The Hampsterdance Song", which was produced by the Boomtang Boys and released on July 4, 2000. Disney did not allow the use of the actual "Whistle Stop" clip, so the Boomtang Boys created a sound-alike rerecording. The liner notes for the single include the statement "Includes elements of 'Whistle Stop' by Roger Miller." A cartoon video was produced for the single that introduced a cartoon "band" of four hamsters; though the song was solely credited to "Hampton the Hampster", the band was later dubbed "Hampton and the Hampsters." The song reached number one on the Canadian Singles Chart while peaking at number 32 on the RPM charts. In Australia, "The Hampsterdance Song" was released in 2001 and reached number five on the ARIA Singles Chart. The song proved to be very successful on Radio Disney, where it became the station's all-time most played song and was later included on the compilation album Radio Disney Ultimate Jams. LaCarte created an online store offering T-shirts and CDs of the fictional group's music. An Flash-animated series was planned by Nelvana, but never made it past the planning process. Prior to the release of "The Hampsterdance Song", a similar song featuring an unofficial sound-alike rendition of "Whistle Stop" was released as "Cognoscenti vs. Intelligentsia" and performed by the Cuban Boys. This version peaked at number 4 on the Christmas 1999 UK singles chart. 

Following the relative success of "The Hampsterdance Song" single, an entire album featuring the fictional band titled Hampsterdance: The Album was released in 2000. Some follow-up singles from this album were moderately successful in Australia, such as "Thank God I'm a Country Boy" (a cover of the John Denver song, reaching number 12) and "Hampster Party" (reaching number 44). Hampsterdance: The Album was reissued with a shorter tracklist as The Hampster Dance Party in 2002. Later album releases were Happy Times Ten (2002), the compilation Hampsterdance Hits (2004), and A Very Hampsterdance Christmas (2008).

Discography

Albums

Reissues

Compilations

Singles

Promotional singles

Direct-to-video film
The direct-to-video animated film How the Hampsters Saved Winter was produced by Abatis International LLC and animated by Unreal Productions, located in New Jersey. The DVD was first released for sale on the Hampster Dance website on April 2, 2009, and was purchasable to as late as 2012. Bill Porfido, the owner of the franchise confirmed in an article that 2000 copies of the film were sold. After the film became unavailable for purchase on the website, the film was thought to be lost as no copies were made available elsewhere. However, four screenshots were featured via a game on the website called Hamster Hijinks. In 2022, the film was archived on the Lost Media Wiki and uploaded onto Youtube.

Notes

References

External links
  
 Hampster dancing into other venues
 Hamster Dance modified to work correctly in modern web browsers

Viral videos
Internet memes introduced in the 1990s
1998 introductions
Fictional hamsters